Saint Himelin (Hymelin, Himelinus) (died Vissenaken, c. 750 AD) was an Irish or Scottish priest who, returning from a pilgrimage to Rome, fell ill when passing through Vissenaken (in present-day part of the municipality Tienen in Belgium).

He is said to have been the brother of Rumbold, patron saint of Mechelen.

The legend of Saint Himelin states that in Vissenaken he asked a girl for some water.  She refused, as there was bubonic plague in the area. However, after much insistence from Himelin, she finally gave him a pitcher of water, which miraculously turned into wine. Himelin died three days later of the plague. He is venerated on 10 March. His cult is confined to Vissenaken.

References

External links
Saint Himelin at Saints.SQPN.com
Saint Himelin at Saint Celtes et Belges (3 bios)  archived by WaybackMachine at web.archive.org  

750 deaths
Belgian Roman Catholic saints
History of Flemish Brabant
Year of birth missing
8th-century Irish priests
8th-century Christian saints
Medieval Irish saints
Medieval Scottish saints
Colombanian saints
People from Tienen